The Adams Township Municipal Authority serves the Mine 42 area of the township with sewage treatment overseeing the conveyance line to the treatment plant that has a capacity of treating 15,000 gallons  of waste water daily.

See also
 List of municipal authorities in Cambria County, Pennsylvania

References

Cambria County, Pennsylvania